XPhos is a phosphine ligand derived from biphenyl. Its palladium complexes exhibit high activity for Buchwald-Hartwig amination reactions involving aryl chlorides and aryl tosylates.  Both palladium and copper complexes of the compound exhibit high activity for the coupling of aryl halides and aryl tosylates with various amides.  It is also an efficient ligand for several commonly used C–C bond-forming cross-coupling reactions, including the Negishi, Suzuki, and the copper-free Sonogashira coupling reactions.  It is especially efficient and general when employed as a (2-aminobiphenyl)-cyclometalated palladium mesylate precatalyst complex (Buchwald's third generation precatalyst system), XPhos-G3-Pd, which is commercially available and stable to bench storage. The ligand itself also has convenient handling characteristics as a crystalline, air-stable solid.

Structure

See also
 SPhos
 CPhos
 Buchwald-Hartwig reaction

References

Tertiary phosphines